Aljaž Bedene was the defending champion, and retained his title after defeat Nicolás Kicker 7–6(7–3), 6–4.

Stefano Napolitano defeated Augusto Virgili in the qualifying 6–0, 6–3, winning the first set without dropping a single point, so called golden set.

Seeds

Draw

Finals

Top half

Bottom half

References

External links
 Main Draw
 Qualifying Draw

Distal and ITR Group Tennis Cup - Singles
2015 Singles